Mehmood Ali (29 September 1932 – 23 July 2004), popularly known simply as Mehmood, was an Indian actor, singer, director and producer best known for playing comic roles in Hindi films.

During his career of more than four decades, he worked in over 300 Hindi films. He is known as India's national comedian. Mehmood received 25 Nominations for filmfare awards, 19 for 'Best Performance in a Comic Role', while the awards started in 1954, awards for the best comedian category started only in 1967. Prior to that Mehmood also received 6 nominations for 'Best Supporting Actor'.

Early life
Mehmood Ali was born on 29 September 1932. He was the second of the eight children, and eldest son to Latifunnisa and film and stage actor/dancer Mumtaz Ali, who was a huge star of the 1940s and 1950s cinema in Bombay. Mehmood had an elder sister and six younger siblings. His sister, Minoo Mumtaz, was also a successful dancer and character actress in Bollywood movies. His youngest brother, Anwar Ali, is also an actor as well as a producer of such movies as Khud-daar and Kaash.

Career

Early career
As a child, he worked in Bombay films like Kismet. He later had a number of odd jobs, selling poultry products and working as a driver for director P. L. Santoshi. Santoshi's son, Rajkumar Santoshi, would later cast him in the film Andaz Apna Apna (1994). Many of Mehmood's film songs were sung by Manna Dey.

Mehmood reportedly taught table tennis to actress Meena Kumari. After marrying legendary actress Meena Kumari's younger sister Madhu in the early 1950s and becoming a father by having a son, Masood, he decided to act to earn a better living starting with a small break as a killer in the film C.I.D. (1956 film). He started off by doing small, unnoticed roles in films like the peanut seller in Do Bigha Zameen and Pyaasa. He later went on to act in lead roles as well, but he was more appreciated for his comedy, some of which was in the Hyderabad region's Urdu accent. Mehmood knew exactly how to tickle the film viewers' funny bone. He was really good at playing the film hero's friend, who would help him out of sticky situations with his street-smart ways.

Besides actress Shubha Khote, he also teamed up with fellow comedian, I. S. Johar and actress Aruna Irani.

Later career
In the late 1970s, Mehmood's popularity began to decline as other comedy actors like Jagdeep, Asrani, Paintal, Deven Verma and Kader Khan shot to prominence. Between 1990 and 1999, he made a handful of movies, but most of them were either shelved or made no impression. He acted as Johnny in Rajkumar Santoshi's Andaz Apna Apna (1994)– his last known film as an actor.

Death
On 23 July 2004
, Mehmood died in his sleep in the American state of Pennsylvania, where he had gone for treatment of cardiovascular heart disease after suffering from poor health over several years. His fans were able to pay homage to him at Mehboob Studio in Bandra, Mumbai.

Legacy
One of his sons, Lucky Ali (Maqsood Ali), is a singer and composer who has also appeared in films. Mehmood was one of the most respected and loved entertainers in the Indian film fraternity. A performer of such caliber that leading men back in the day used to reject films because their presence used to diminish in films if they starred with Mehmood.

He was the one who introduced Amitabh Bachchan into the commercial cinema space. Mehmood saw potential in Amitabh and put him in films like Bombay To Goa (1972) which was a success. Mehmood later on in an interview said that he has forgiven Amitabh. He also gave a break to the music director R. D. Burman whose first independent film as music director was Chhote Nawab (1961) and to Rajesh Roshan with his own production Kunwara Baap (1974 film).

Famous American actor, Gregory Peck said Mehmood was too handsome to be a comedian.

Filmography

Awards

See also 
 Mehmood Ali Family
 List of Hindi film clans

References

External links 
Filmography of Mehmood on Complete Index To World Film (CITWF) website

Further reading 
 Zaveri, Hanif. Mehmood, a Man of Many Moods, Popular Prakashan, 2005. 

1932 births
2004 deaths
Deaths from respiratory failure
Indian male film actors
Male actors in Hindi cinema
Filmfare Awards winners
Indian male comedians
Muslim male comedians
20th-century Indian male actors
20th-century Indian singers
Indian male composers
20th-century Indian composers
20th-century Indian film directors
Film directors from Bangalore
Hindi film producers
Film producers from Bangalore
Male actors from Bangalore
20th-century comedians
20th-century Indian male singers